The 1996 Bulgarian Cup Final was played at the Vasil Levski National Stadium in Sofia on 1 May 1996, and was contested between the sides of Slavia Sofia and Levski Sofia. The match was won by Slavia Sofia. The Levski Sofia players were ordered off the field of play by the chairman Tomas Lafchis shortly after the 75' mark due to the latter's dissatisfaction with the refereeing. Slavia were eventually awarded a 4:0 victory while the 11 footballers who left the pitch were banned for 4 matches.

Match

Details

See also
1995–96 A Group

References

Bulgarian Cup finals
PFC Slavia Sofia matches
PFC Levski Sofia matches
Cup Final